is a Japanese author and a politician. He is also an economic anthropologist and a philosopher who introduced the ideas of Karl Polanyi and his younger brother Michael Polanyi to Japan. He was a professor at universities such as Meiji University and Northwestern University.

During the 1980s his works were categorized in Japan as "new academism", which included works by Akira Asada, Kojin Karatani and Shigehiko Hasumi.

He frequently acted as a judge in the television show Iron Chef, appearing more often than any other judge.

Works

Academic books
Economic anthropology 経済人類学
Economy as illusions　幻想としての経済
Apes in pants　パンツをはいたサル  
The iron maiden　鉄の処女
Meaning and Living　意味と生命
Budapest story ブダペスト物語

Literary books
Against girls 反少女(short stories)
Against literary theories 反文学論(criticism)
The blood of Tokyo cries doooooooon 東京の血はどおーんと騒ぐ　(an essay like a novel)

Political Affiliations
Liberal Democratic Party (Japan)
Internet Breakthrough Party of Japan

See also
Tacit knowledge
Peter F Drucker　- He visited Japan to talk with Kurimoto about Karl Polanyi who discovered his talent.
Masayuki Yamato -  a scientist who instructed Haruko Obokata.He was influenced by Kurimoto in philosophy and identified himself as a member of 'Kurimoto school' in an essay titled 'SMALLTALK between AI and TK(tacit knowing)'.

Sources

External links
Homopants.com

1941 births
Japanese economists
Japanese anthropologists
Japanese philosophers
Japanese politicians
Japanese writers
Japanese television personalities
Living people